There were five elections in 1981 to the United States House of Representatives:

List of elections 

Elections are listed by date and district.

|-
! 
| David Stockman
|  | Republican
| 
|  | Incumbent resigned January 27, 1981, to become Director of the Office of Management and Budget.New member elected April 21, 1981.Republican hold.
| nowrap | 

|-
! 
| Gladys Spellman
|  | Democratic
| 
|  |  Incapacitated since last Congress and seat declared vacant February 24, 1981.New member elected May 19, 1981.Democratic hold.
| nowrap | 

|-
! 
| Tennyson Guyer
|  | Republican
| 
|  | Incumbent died April 12, 1981.New member elected June 25, 1981. Republican hold.
| nowrap | 

|-
! 
| Jon Hinson
|  | Republican
| 
|  | Incumbent resigned April 13, 1981.New member elected July 7, 1981.Democratic gain.
| nowrap | 

|-
! 
| Raymond F. Lederer
|  | Democratic
| 
|  | Incumbent resigned April 29, 1981, before a planned expulsion vote, having been convicted of bribery in the Abscam sting operation.New member elected July 21, 1981.Democratic hold.
| nowrap | 

|}

References 

 
1981